Altın Çağ (Golden Age) is the eighth studio album by Turkish singer Bengü. It was released on 31 May 2017 by DMC and contains 11 songs in total. The album's lead single "Kuzum", written by Ayla Çelik, was released together with a music video on 24 May 2017 and subsequently ranked second on the MusicTopTR Official List. The album's third music video was prepared for the song "Geçmiş Olsun", which entered the MusicTopTR Official List and ranked seventh.

Track listing

Release history

References

External links 
 

Bengü albums
2017 albums